Bob Fisher may refer to:

 Bob Fisher (baseball) (1886–1963), baseball player who played shortstop from 1912 to 1919
 Bob Fisher (screenwriter) (fl. 2000s), screenwriter whose credits include Wedding Crashers
 Bob Fisher (American football coach) (1887–1942), American football player and coach
 Bob Fisher (offensive lineman) (1916–1983), American football player
 Bob Fisher (football manager), English association football manager active in France
 Bob Fisher (Australian footballer) (born 1929), Australian rules footballer
 Bob Fisher (tight end) (born 1958), American football tight end

See also 
 Bobby Fischer (1943–2008), chess grandmaster
 Robert Fisher (disambiguation)